Hannah Forster (born 22 February 1991) is an English female football midfielder. She currently plays for Fylde Ladies F.C. She was born in Wigan.

Club career
Forster joined Blackburn's centre of excellence in the 2006 close season, after a successful trial, and was a regular on the bench the following season for the first team in the FA Women's Premier League. In February 2007 Forster came on a substitute for Rovers in the final of the Lancashire Cup, scoring one of six goals as Rovers retained the trophy. In November 2007, Forster scored three times as Rovers beat Preston Ladies 18–0 in the Second Round of the Lancashire Cup. She scored again as Rovers beat Brazil Ladies 17–0 in the following round.

In June 2009 she was awarded the Reserve Manager's Player of the Year trophy.

International career
At the age of 11 years, and at the time a ball girl for Wigan Athletic, Forster played in the United Kingdom team the Fox Kids Cup in Barcelona.

Statistics

References

English women's footballers
Blackburn Rovers L.F.C. players
FA Women's National League players
1991 births
Living people
Women's association football midfielders
Fylde Ladies F.C. players